USS Underwood (FFG-36) was the twenty-seventh ship of the  of guided-missile frigates, named for Captain Gordon Waite Underwood (1910–1978).

Ordered from Bath Iron Works, Bath, Maine, on 27 April 1979 as part of the FY79 program, Underwood was laid down on 30 July 1981, launched on 6 February 1982, and commissioned on 29 January 1983.  She was assigned to Destroyer Squadron 14 and homeported at Mayport, FL.

On 13 January 2010, Underwood was ordered to assist in the humanitarian relief efforts following the 2010 Haiti earthquake.

Underwood was extensively used to counteract drug trafficking in Latin America with the assistance of the Coast Guard.

Underwood was decommissioned on 8 March 2013.

References

External links

Official website
MaritimeQuest USS Underwood FFG-36 pages
GlobalSecurity.org FFG-36

 

1982 ships
Oliver Hazard Perry-class frigates of the United States Navy
Ships built in Bath, Maine